The Unwelcome Warlock is a fantasy novel by American writer Lawrence Watt-Evans, the eleventh book in the Legends of Ethshar series. It was produced as a serial under the name The Final Calling making it the latest of the four such novels written by Watt-Evans and supported entirely by reader donations. A sequel to Night of Madness, The Unwilling Warlord and The Vondish Ambassador, this book features a number of characters from those previous books. A number of other installments to the Ethshar series are referenced, including The Blood of a Dragon and the as yet unwritten Dumery of the Dragon. The Final Calling was completed on 6 March 2011 and was published by Wildside Press under the title The Unwelcome Warlock in January 2012.

References

External links
 
 

2011 American novels
Novels first published in serial form
American fantasy novels
Wildside Press books